The World Bank-China ranking controversy refers to the alleged manipulation of China’s ranking in the World Bank’s annual Doing Business report by World Bank officials while they were negotiating a multibillion-dollar capital increase from China.

On September 18, the World Bank said it was suspending Doing Business ranking over data irregularities.

See also  
 Kristalina Georgieva
 World Bank Group

References 

Political scandals
Political controversies
Economic controversies